Neosuchia is a clade within Mesoeucrocodylia that includes all modern extant crocodilians and their closest fossil relatives. It is defined as the most inclusive clade containing all crocodylomorphs more closely related to Crocodylus niloticus (the Nile Crocodile) than to Notosuchus terrestris. Members of Neosuchia generally share a crocodilian-like bodyform adapted to freshwater aquatic life, as opposed to the terrestrial habits of more basal crocodylomorph groups. The earliest neosuchian is suggested to be the Early Jurassic Calsoyasuchus, which lived during the Sinemurian and Pliensbachian stages in North America. It is often identified as a member of Goniopholididae, though this is disputed, and the taxon may lie outside Neosuchia, which places the earliest records of the group in the Middle Jurassic.

Characteristics
A tooth notch between the maxilla and premaxilla is a basal characteristic of the Neosuchia, although it is lost in some more derived forms, most notably alligatorids.

Classification
 Basal Neosuchia
 Genus Burkesuchus?
 Genus Deltasuchus
 Genus Khoratosuchus
 Genus Lisboasaurus
 Genus Paluxysuchus
 Genus Stolokrosuchus
 Genus Wahasuchus? 
 Family Susisuchidae
 Clade Coelognathosuchia
 Family Goniopholididae
 ?Family Pholidosauridae
 Suborder Tethysuchia
 Family Elosuchidae
 Family Dyrosauridae
 Family Pholidosauridae
 Family Stomatosuchidae
 Family Bernissartiidae
 Genus Gilchristosuchus
 Suborder Eusuchia

Phylogeny

Below is a cladogram showing the phylogenetic relationships of neosuchians from Buscalioni et al., 2011:

In 2012, paleontologists Mario Bronzati, Felipe Chinaglia Montefeltro, and Max C. Langer conducted a broad phylogenetic analysis to produce supertrees of Crocodyliformes, including 184 species. The most parsimonious trees were highly resolved, meaning the phylogenetic relationships found in the analysis were highly likely. Below is a consensus tree from the study:

See also 

Koumpiodontosuchus aprosdokiti

References

External links
 Neosuchia in the Paleobiology Database

Jurassic crocodylomorphs
Cretaceous crocodylomorphs
Paleogene crocodylomorphs
Neogene crocodylomorphs
Extant Early Jurassic first appearances